Anton Andreyevich Brusnikin (born 13 January 1986) is a former Russian professional footballer.

Career
Brusnikin began playing professional football with Russian Football National League side FC Petrotrest St. Petersburg, but left the club for FC Khimki in 2006. He later played in the FNL in 2007 for FC Tekstilshchik Ivanovo.

References

External links
 
 
 

1986 births
Footballers from Saint Petersburg
Living people
Russian footballers
Association football midfielders
FC Zenit Saint Petersburg players
FC Petrotrest players
FC Khimki players
FC Tekstilshchik Ivanovo players
FC Torpedo-BelAZ Zhodino players
Belarusian Premier League players
Russian expatriate footballers
Expatriate footballers in Belarus